Fatma of the Forest is a 28-minute color Turkish documentary film about  Tahtacı people directed by Süha Arın. It was first shown in 1979, the International Year of the Child.

The film shows the life of a 12-year-old Tahtacı girl and her family in the forests of the high Taurus Mountains.

Crew 
 Director: Suha Arın
 Assistant Director and Editor: Nesli Çölgeçen, Cemal Karman, Kemal Sevimli, Yalcin Yelence
 Director of Photography: Hasan Ozgen
 Camera: Savas Guvezne
 Music Arrangement: Mehmet Erenler, Nevit Kodallı

Awards 
First Prize in The International 3rd Balkan Film Festival (1979)
International Damascus Film Festival Silver Sword Award (1979)
Antalya Film Festival Golden Orange Award (1979)
First Prize in The Short Film Competition of Turkey Ministry of Culture (1979)

References

Forestry in Turkey
Turkish short documentary films
1970s short documentary films
1970s Turkish-language films